Daniel Paul Rakowitz is an American murderer and cannibal.

He was born in 1960 in Fort Leonard Wood, Missouri, where his father was a criminal investigator for the U.S. Army. The Rakowitz family moved to Rockport, Texas sometime in the late 1970s. Daniel Rakowitz graduated from Rockport-Fulton High School in 1980. Although it is commonly reported that Rakowitz graduated from Rockport, he actually attended and graduated from high school in Refugio, Texas.

He moved to New York City around 1985. Rakowitz, an eccentric well known to his East Village neighbors as a marijuana dealer and owner of a pet rooster, founded his own religion - the Church of 966.

In 1989, he walked around the East Village around Tompkins Square Park bragging to some of the people he believed were his disciples that he had killed the woman he believed to be his live-in girlfriend (but who was actually a roommate), Monika Beerle, a Swiss student at the Martha Graham Center of Contemporary Dance, and a dancer at Billy's Topless. Several of Rakowitz's friends disputed the notion that Monika was his girlfriend. By his own confession, he dismembered her body in the bathtub, boiled the parts, and served some of her remains in the form of a soup to the homeless in nearby Tompkins Square Park. He said that he had boiled her head and made soup from her brain. He had tasted it and liked it, and thereafter he referred to himself as a cannibal. At least one of the people to whom he told his tale went to police. Rakowitz was arrested shortly thereafter, and led the police to the Port Authority Bus Terminal storage area, where he had stored her skull and teeth.

On February 22, 1991, a New York jury found Rakowitz, then 31 years old, not guilty by reason of insanity for the killing of Monika Beerle on August 19, 1989. In 2004, a jury found Rakowitz no longer dangerous but decided that he is still mentally ill and should remain at the Kirby Forensic Psychiatric Center on New York City's Wards Island.

References

1960 births
Living people
People from Rockport, Texas
American cannibals
People acquitted by reason of insanity
People acquitted of murder
American murderers
People from Fort Leonard Wood, Missouri
People from the East Village, Manhattan